Pewar its 16 km far from the capital city Parachinar of Kurram District, and the one of the village near to parachinar Khyber Pakhtunkhwa province of Pakistan. Pewar is situated on a neck of Pakistani territory south of Peshawar, that juts into Paktia Province of Afghanistan. It is the closest point in Pakistan to Kabul and borders on the Tora Bora region of Afghanistan. Turi, Bangash, Orakzai, Zazai (Jaji), Mangal and Para Tsamkani are the major tribes in Pewar, Parachinar. Pewar has four seasons. Pewar is known for its fresh fruits, fresh vegetables and snowfall.

History 
The name Pewar may derive from Pashto word pawar which mean one by one people come to protect that area which is located too near the border to Afghanistan. The previous name, used for pawar was Tutki, which is still used by some Afghan people. The inhabitants of Tutki were called Tutkiwal.

Parachinar originated as a summer residence for nomadic tribes who wintered their livestock at lower altitudes, and the district had originally been a summer residence for Moghul emperors from Delhi. The Pewar region was part of Durrani empire before the Second Afghan War of 1878–79, but was not firmly annexed by the British until 1892. During the colonial era and 1947, Parachinar became a hill station for people from Peshawar; as it is relatively cool in the summer and very easy to reach from the plains despite its high altitude since there are no steep ascents on the route from Peshawar.

Because of its proximity to the border of Afghanistan, in recent years, the economy of Parachinar has been adversely affected, with tourism in steep decline.

Climate
Pewar has a moderate humid subtropical climate with much higher rainfall and sownfall than most areas of Pakistan. Although the city's southeasterly aspect relative to the valley in which it is situated allows it to receive on occasions significant monsoon rainfall, the most frequent source of rain is western depressions and related thunderstorms. During the winter, snowfall is common, and frosts occur on most mornings. Snow closes the Peiwar Pass, located on the Paktia border just over 20 km west of Parachinar, for up to five months per year. Pewar is 16:km from Parachinar. Parachinar is the main city of kurram agency FATA.

Schools

Notable schools in Pewar are Government high school Pewar, Government girls high school Pewar, Pewar Children Academy and Community Model high school.

Rest houses 

 Circuit House
 Chapri Rest House (Approx 9,941 feet High)
 Malana dam rest house

See also 
 Parachinar Airport
 List of airports in Pakistan
 Battle of Tora Bora
 Kurram Agency War April 2007
 Tari Mangal

References 

Populated places in Kurram District